David Gray is an Australian singer.

Discography

Albums

References

20th-century Australian  male singers
Living people
Year of birth missing (living people)